This is a list of South Korean idol groups that debuted in the 2000s. Only groups with articles on Wikipedia are listed here.

2000 

Chakra
Papaya
UN

2001 

5tion
Jewelry
jtL
K'Pop
KISS
M.I.L.K

2002 

 Black Beat
 F-iV
 Isak N Jiyeon
 LUV
 MC the Max
 Noel
 Shinvi
 Sugar

2003 

Brown Eyed Soul
Take
TVXQ

2004 

TRAX
V.O.S

2005 

Gavy NJ
LPG
Paran
SS501
Super Junior
The Grace

2006 

2NB
Big Bang
Brown Eyed Girls
SeeYa
Super Junior-K.R.Y.
Untouchable

2007 

Baby Vox Re.V
Black Pearl
F.T. Island
Girls' Generation
Kara
Sunny Hill
Super Junior-T
Supernova
T-max
Tritops
Wonder Girls

2008 

2AM
2PM
Davichi
Miss $
Shinee
Super Junior-H
Super Junior-M 
U-KISS

2009 

2NE1
4Minute
After School
Beast
CNBLUE
f(x)
JQT
MBLAQ
Rainbow
Secret
SHU-I
T-ara
Urban Zakapa

See also
 List of South Korean idol groups (1990s) 
 List of South Korean idol groups (2010s)
 List of South Korean idol groups (2020s)

References

 
Lists of South Korean bands
2000s in South Korean music